Sandford may refer to:

People
 Baron Sandford
 Baron Mount Sandford
 Sandford (surname)
 Sandford Fleming (1827-1915), Scottish-Canadian engineer and inventor of Standard Time

Places

Australia
 Sandford, Tasmania
 Sandford, Victoria

Canada
 Sandford, Nova Scotia

England
 Dry Sandford, Oxfordshire
Sandford, Cumbria, village in Eden district
 Sandford, Devon
 Sandford, Dorset
 Sandford, Hampshire
 Sandford, Isle of Wight
 Sandford-on-Thames, Oxfordshire
 Sandford Orcas
 Sandford St. Martin, Oxfordshire
 Sandford, Somerset
 Sandford, Whitchurch, near Whitchurch, location of Sandford Hall, home of the Sandford family
 Sandford, Gloucestershire, a fictional village in the film Hot Fuzz
 Sandford, a mockup village in Cheshire used for training police, part of Bruche Police National Training Centre

Ireland
 Sandford Park School, Dublin

Scotland
 Sandford, South Lanarkshire
 An older spelling of St Fort, Forgan, Fife
 An older spelling of St Ford, Kilconquhar, Fife

United States
 Sandford, Indiana

See also
 Sandiford (disambiguation)
 Sandyford (disambiguation)
 Sanford (disambiguation)
 Zandvoort, North Holland, Netherlands
 Zandvoorde (disambiguation)